Shatruvu is a 2013 Indian Telugu-language thriller film directed by N.S.R Prasad and starring Srikanth and Aksha Pardasany.

Cast 
Srikanth as Shankaranna a.k.a. Shankar
Aksha Pardasany as Anusha a.k.a. Anu
Rahman as Arvind
Prabhakar
Raghu Babu
Duvvasi Mohan

Production
The film was shot in Hyderabad and Bangkok.

Soundtrack
Music by Gana.
Regupallu - Malathi
Jabili - Rajesh, Bhargavi Pillai
Dhama Dhama - Vijay Prakash
Ammevaro - Nitya Santhoshini, Rajesh
Shalalalaa - Suchitra, Kenny

Reception
Karthik Pasupulate of The Times of India opined that "It seems like a B-Grade action film from the nineties and everything looks too outdated. There are too many loopholes in the script and the execution so analysis into what all went wrong will be a waste of time". A critic from 123telugu gave the film a rating of 1 out of 5. The critic called the film outdated and said that Srikanth should do such films.

References